John McCreery is the name of: 
*John W. McCreery, West Virginia State Senator
John Alexander McCreery (1884–1948), American surgeon